is a Japanese manga artist.

Hagio made her debut as a manga artist in 1969 at the publishing company Kodansha before moving to Shogakukan in 1971, where she was able to publish her more radical and unconventional works that had been rejected by other publishers. Her first serializations at Shogakukan – the vampire fantasy The Poe Clan, the shōnen-ai (male-male romance) drama The Heart of Thomas, and the science fiction thriller They Were Eleven – were among the first works of shōjo manga to achieve mainstream critical and commercial success. Hagio subsequently emerged as a central figure in the Year 24 Group, a grouping of female manga artists who significantly influenced shōjo manga in the 1970s by introducing new aesthetic styles and expanding the category to incorporate new genres. Since the 1980s, Hagio has drawn primarily adult-oriented manga in the manga magazine Petit Flower and its successor publication Flowers, notably Marginal, A Cruel God Reigns, and Nanohana.

While Hagio primarily authors works in the science fiction, fantasy, and shōnen-ai genres, her manga explores a wide range of themes and subjects, including comedy, historical drama, and social and environmental issues. She has been recognized with numerous awards both in Japan and internationally, including the Order of the Rising Sun, a Medal of Honor, and commendation as a Person of Cultural Merit.

Biography

Early life and career
Moto Hagio was born on May 12, 1949, in Ōmuta, Fukuoka. The second of four siblings, Hagio's father worked as dockworker, while her mother was a homemaker. Because of her father's job, the Hagio family moved frequently between Omuta and Suita in Osaka Prefecture. Hagio began to draw at an early age in her spare time, and attended private art lessons with her older sister. In her third year of elementary school, she began reading manga that she acquired at kashi-hon (book rental stores) and her school library. Her parents discouraged her interest in illustration and manga, which Hagio states they viewed as "something for children not old enough to read" and "an impediment to studying"; this would be a major contributing factor to what would become a lifelong strained relationship with her parents.

During her childhood, Hagio read and became influenced by the works of manga artists Osamu Tezuka, Shōtarō Ishinomori, Hideko Mizuno, and Masako Watanabe, as well as literary fiction by Japanese authors such as Kenji Miyazawa and western science fiction and fantasy authors such as Isaac Asimov, Arthur C. Clarke, and Robert A. Heinlein. She began to seriously consider a professional career in manga after reading Tezuka's manga series Shinsengumi in 1965, and in 1967 began submitting manga manuscripts to various publishers, including Kodansha, Shueisha, and Tezuka's own manga magazine COM.

In her senior year of high school Hagio met manga artist , who also lived in Ōmuta and was pursuing a professional career at Kodansha while still in high school. After graduating, Hirata moved to Tokyo and offered to introduce Hagio to her editor, which Hagio accepted. Hagio made her professional debut as a manga artist in Kodansha's Nakayoshi manga magazine, with the short stories Lulu to Mimi in August 1969 and Suteki na Mahō in September 1969. Hagio began working for Nakayoshi under a new editor, but struggled under the editorial constraints of the magazine: Nakayoshi published primarily sports manga for children, while Hagio preferred to write science fiction and fantasy stories focused on mature themes and subject material. Her next four manuscripts submitted to Nakayoshi were consequently rejected, with her editors instructing her to write stories that were "more interesting and cheerful". In 1970, Hagio published the one-shot (single-chapter) manga stories Cool Cat and Bakuhatsu Gaisha in Nakayoshi.

Breakthrough and the Year 24 Group

Masuyama gifted Hagio a copy of the novel Demian by Hermann Hesse, an author whose novels came to greatly affect Hagio and significantly influenced her manga. Contemporaneously, Hagio's editor assigned her to assist manga artist Keiko Takemiya, whose work had been published in Nakayoshi, COM, and Margaret. The two artists became friends, and Takemiya suggested that they move to an apartment in Tokyo together; Hagio, who was still living with her parents in Ōmuta and unsure of her future as a manga artist, initially refused her invitation. Yamamoto agreed to publish Hagio's previously rejected manuscripts, and Hagio accepted Takemiya's offer to move to Tokyo.

In 1971, Hagio and Takemiya moved to a rented house in Ōizumigakuenchō, Nerima, Tokyo located near the home of Norie Masuyama. Together, the three women decided to create a living space modeled off of 19th French literary salons, nicknamed the "Ōizumi Salon". The Ōizumi Salon aimed to improve the quality and reputation of shōjo manga, a demographic which at the time was dismissed by critics as publishing frivolous stories for young children. This grouping of artists would come to be referred to as the Year 24 Group. The Year 24 Group contributed significantly to the development of shōjo manga by introducing new aesthetic styles and expanding the demographic to incorporate elements of science fiction, historical fiction, adventure fiction, and same-sex romance: both male-male (shōnen-ai and yaoi) and female-female (yuri). During this period, Hagio published the shōnen-ai one-shot The November Gymnasium in 1971, followed by the vampire fantasy The Poe Clan in 1972,  with the latter series becoming Hagio's first major critical and commercial success. The Poe Clan was also the first series that Shogakukan published as a tankōbon (collected edition); the first tankōbon edition of The Poe Clan sold out its initial print run of 30,000 copies in three days, an unprecedented sales volume at the time for a shōjo manga series that had not been adapted into an anime.

Following a 1973 trip to Europe by Hagio, Masuyama, and Yamagishi, Takemiya announced that the Ōizumi Salon would cease, as she preferred to continue her career alone. Decades later, both Hagio and Takemiya would disclose that the pair had a falling out in 1973 that remains unreconciled; Takemiya has written in her memoirs about feelings of jealously and an inferiority complex towards Hagio, while Hagio has written that their relationship was strained by accusations from critics that she plagiarized her shōnen-ai works from Takemiya. Nonetheless, the innovation introduced to shōjo manga by the Year 24 Group significantly contributed to the development of the demographic, bringing it to what critics have described as its "golden age".

Career as a manga artist
In the wake of the critical and commercial success of The Rose of Versailles by Year 24 Group member Riyoko Ikeda, Hagio's editor  asked her to create a series of similar length and complexity for publication in the manga magazine Shūkan Shōjo Comic. The resulting series was The Heart of Thomas, a long-form serialized version of Hagio's earlier The November Gymnasium, which began serialization in the magazine in 1974. Though initially poorly received by readers, by the end of its serialization The Heart of Thomas was among the most popular series in Shūkan Shōjo Comic. The critical and commercial success of both The Poe Clan and The Heart of Thomas freed Hagio from most editorial constraints and allowed her to publish her previously rejected works of science fiction, a genre which at the time was perceived as inappropriate for female audiences and thus was effectively non-existent in shōjo manga.

They Were Eleven, Hagio's first published science fiction manga series, began serialization in Bessatsu Shōjo Comic in 1975. Hagio began to establish herself as a science fiction writer and moved away from the constraints of shōjo magazines, publishing a manga adaptation of science fiction writer Ryu Mitsuse's novel Hyakuoku no Hiru to Sen'oku no Yoru in the shōnen manga (boys' manga) magazine Weekly Shōnen Champion in 1977. This was followed by several manga adaptations of the works of Ray Bradbury published as the one-shot anthology U wa Uchuusen no U beginning in 1977, Gin no Sankaku in 1980, and various one-shots in the science-fiction focused S-F Magazine. Hagio did create science fiction works for shōjo magazines during this period, notably Star Red for Shūkan Shōjo Comic from 1978 to 1979.

In 1980 Yamamoto became the founding editor of Petit Flower, a new magazine at Shogakukan that published manga aimed at an adult female audience. Hagio moved to the magazine, where she was given full editorial control over the manga she produced. In the subsequent decades Hagio would publish many works in Petit Flower and its successor publication Flowers that are distinguished by their mature themes and subject material. Notable works include the crime thriller Mesh in 1980, the post-apocalyptic science fiction series Marginal from 1985 to 1987, the semi-autobiographical Iguana Girl in 1992, and A Cruel God Reigns from 1993 to 2001. Hagio's works during this period were generally not influenced by developments in contemporary shōjo manga, such as the erotic manga of artists like Kyoko Okazaki and the josei manga or artists like Erica Sakurazawa.

Hagio began teaching manga studies as a visiting professor at the Joshibi University of Art and Design in 2011. That same year, the Fukushima nuclear disaster occurred; with the publication of her manga series Nanohana, Hagio became one of the first manga artists following Kotobuki Shiriagari to address the disaster directly in her work; Hagio's prominence as an artist is credited with influencing other manga artists to address the disaster in their works. To mark the fifteenth anniversary of Flowers in 2016, Hagio launched a revival of The Poe Clan in the magazine, publishing new chapters nearly forty years after the conclusion of the original series.

Style and influences

When asked about her visual influences, Hagio responded that she was influenced by Shotaro Ishinomori's page layouts, Hideko Mizuno's clothing, and Masako Yashiro's eyes.

In the early 1970s, Hagio and her fellow Year 24 Group members contributed significantly to the establishment of shōjo manga as a distinct category of manga, iterating on contributions made to the category in the 1950s and 1960s by artists such as Macoto Takahashi to establish a "visual grammar of shōjo manga". Chief among these developments was the use of interior monologue, which was written outside of speech balloons and scattered across the page. These monologues allow the exploration of the characters' interiority and emotions, and serve to compensate for the absence of third-person narration in manga.

In Hagio's manga specifically, interior monologues are often accompanied by symbolic motifs that extend beyond panel borders and overlap in a manner resembling a montage or a collage, creating a three-dimensional effect. These motifs are often composed of decorative elements (flowers, clouds, screentones, etc.) but are also often lines, sparkles, and onomatopoeia which serve to reinforce the "exploration of the interiority" of the characters. Hagio also makes use of full-body portraits of main characters, a technique originated Macoto Takahashi, as well as superimposed close-ups of these characters, to mark the character as important in the narrative. Hagio also uses mise-en-scène and lighting marked a strong contrast of shadow and light, giving a theatrical effect to her works.

When Hagio began to create manga for an adult audience beginning with Mesh in 1980, she adopted a more realist style. In particular, she changed the body shape of her characters, who until then exhibited the typical shōjo style of heads that were proportionally larger than the rest of their bodies. She also gradually altered her page layouts, especially during the 2000s, to make her style more accessible to a new readership.

Themes and motifs
Hagio primarily authors works in the science fiction, fantasy, and boys' love genres, though her works explore a wide variety of themes and subjects. This is especially true of her short stories, which have depicted a variety of topics and genres including comedy, historical drama, and social and environmental issues. Though her works are primarily aimed at a female audience, she does also attract a male readership.

Dysfunctional families

Hagio has long had a difficult relationship with her parents, who disapproved of her career as a manga artist even after she achieved mainstream critical and commercial success; it was not until 2010, when Hagio was 61 years old, that her mother accepted her profession. This strained relationship, combined with Hagio's own interest in family psychology, has had a significant impact on her manga. Families and familial drama recur as common motifs in Hagio's manga, especially twins, which are inspired by Hagio's childhood fantasy of having a twin sister so that her mother would pay more attention to her, and mothers, who are typically portrayed as incapable of loving their children and frequently die.

Initially, Hagio approached manga as an opportunity to depict "something beautiful", rather than an "ugly" reality. Consequently, she avoided contemporary Japanese settings for her early works, instead preferring European or otherworldly sci-fi settings. These early works nevertheless address dysfunctional family relationships, such as her one-shot Bianca (1970), a "gothic revenge plot" by a child against their parents and older authority figures. Her 1992 one-shot Iguana Girl became a turning point in both her life and career. In this semi-autobiographical story, a mother perceives her daughter as an iguana and rejects her; the daughter internalizes this rejection, and is in turn convinced that she is an iguana. Hagio has described the process of writing the story as a means of making peace with her family, and following its publication, she became more comfortable writing works set in contemporary Japan. Familial drama nevertheless remains a common theme in her works, as expressed in stories that address topics of child abandonment, incestual rape, and abortion.

Bishōnen and shōnen-ai

Hagio's works typically feature male rather than female protagonists, especially bishōnen ( "beautiful boys", a term for handsome and androgynous young men). She has described a "sense of liberation" that comes from writing male characters, as they allow her to express thoughts and concepts freely, in contrast to female protagonists who face the restrictions of a patriarchal society. Hagio first introduced bishōnen protagonists to her works with The November Gymnasium in 1971. The series is set in an all-boys boarding school, though an early draft of the story had a girls boarding school as its setting in order to conform to the conventions of the shōjo manga of the time, resulting in a story of the Class S genre. Dissatisfied with the draft, Hagio changed the protagonists to bishōnen; this aligned the story with the then-nascent genre of shōnen-ai, the precursor to modern boys' love (male-male romance manga).

The bishōnen of Hagio's works are both non-sexual and androgynous: socially masculine, physically androgynous, and psychologically feminine. The meaning of gender ambiguity has been variously considered by critics: from a queer perspective by manga scholar James Welker as an expression of sublimated lesbian identity, and from a feminist perspective by sociologist Chizuko Ueno it as an attempt to break out of the patriarchal dichotomy by creating a "third sex".

Feminist science fiction
Hagio's science fiction works depict themes and subjects typical of the genre, such as human cloning and time travel, but also take advantage of the genre's ability to depict worlds in which gender-based differences and power imbalances differ from that of the real word. Hagio's science fiction manga frequently explores topics relating to the place women in society, motherhood, and gender fluidity, taking particular inspiration from the works of Ursula K. Le Guin.

Notable examples include They Were Eleven, which depicts characters who belong to a race where individuals are asexual at birth and whose sex is determined at adulthood; Star Red, which depicts a protagonist who is birthed by a male character, and Marginal, which is set in a society that has become majority male through the use of sexual biological engineering. This feminist science fiction, where characters that blur distinctions of sex and gender, challenges notions of dualism and sexual dimorphism and has been argued by sociologist Chizuko Ueno as representing an evolution of the feminist use of the boys' love genre to explore these themes. It has also inspired the works of other shōjo science fiction manga artists, such as Reiko Shimizu and Saki Hiwatari.

Works

Manga
The following is a list of Hagio's serialized and one-shot manga works. Serializations refer to multi-chapter works that are typically later published as collected editions (tankōbon), while one-shots refer to single-chapter works that are sometimes later collected in anthologies. Titles for works that have not received an official English-language translation or do not have an English title are listed using Hepburn romanization. All dates and publishers are sourced from The 50th Anniversary of The Poe Clan and the World of Moto Hagio unless otherwise noted.

Serials

One-shots

English-translated works
Four Shōjo Stories (1996, Viz Media)
Multi-author anthology containing They Were Eleven.
A, A Prime (1997, Viz Media)
Collects A, A''', 4/4, and X+Y.
 A Drunken Dream and Other Stories (2010, Fantagraphics Books)
 Collects Bianca; Girl on Porch with Puppy; Autumn Journey; Marié, Ten Years Later; A Drunken Dream; Hanshin: Half God; Angel Mimic; Iguana Girl; The Child Who Comes Home; and The Willow Tree.The Heart of Thomas (2013, Fantagraphics Books)Otherworld Barbara (Fantagraphics Books), published as:
 Otherworld Barbara Volume 1 (2016)
 Otherworld Barbara Volume 2 (2017)
 Neo Parasyte m (2017, Kodansha Comics)
Multi-author anthology containing Through Yura's Gate. The Poe Clan (Fantagraphics Books), published as:
 The Poe Clan Volume 1 (2019)
 The Poe Clan Volume 2 (2022)
 Lil' Leo (2021, Denpa)
 They Were Eleven (2023, Denpa)

Essays & memoirs
 . 1998, Anzudo, 
 . 2009, 
 . 2011, 
 . 2018, Shinchosha, 
 . 2021, Kawade Shobō Shinsha, 

Other
 Toki no Tabibito: Time Stranger, character designer (1986, animated film)
 Illusion of Gaia, character designer (1993, video game)

Reception
Influence
She, along with the other artists associated with the Year 24 Group, is credited with "revolutionizing" shōjo manga and bringing it into its "golden age", making shōjo manga central to manga production in the 1980s and attracting a male readership to the category for the first time. Hagio and Keiko Takemiya originated the shōnen-ai genre, which was developed throughout the 1980s and 1990s to become yaoi, a major genre of manga. She is further credited with establishing science fiction as a subgenre of shōjo'' manga, though Hagio's impact on science fiction extends beyond manga to literature through her illustrations of science fiction and fantasy novels, with science fiction novelists such as Azusa Noa and Baku Yumemakura citing Hagio as among their influences.

Awards and nominations

Notes

References

Citations

Bibliography

External links
 

 
1949 births
Anime character designers
Japanese female comics artists
Living people
Women manga artists
Manga artists from Fukuoka Prefecture
People from Ōmuta, Fukuoka
Female comics writers
20th-century Japanese women writers
20th-century Japanese writers
21st-century Japanese women writers
21st-century Japanese writers
Recipients of the Medal with Purple Ribbon
Recipients of the Order of the Rising Sun, 3rd class
Persons of Cultural Merit
Shōnen-ai
Inkpot Award winners